Sir John Wroth (1627-1664) was an English landowner.

He was the son of Sir Peter Wroth of Blendon (d. 1644) and Margaret, daughter of Sir Anthony Dering (d. 1636) of Surrenden Dering in Pluckley, Kent.

His home was Blendon Hall near Bexley in Kent. He was made a baronet on 29 November 1660.

In May 1650 he married Anne Caulfield, widow of Sir Paul Harris and Sir Ralph Gore. Some sources say Anne was the daughter of William Caulfield, others that her father was William's uncle Toby Caulfeild, 1st Baron Caulfeild of Charlemont in Ireland.

Wroth contributed to a family history in manuscript. He wrote that his great-grandfather Sir Thomas Wroth was Groom of the Stool to Edward VI. He had his portrait painted by Robert Walker in 1651, and Samuel Cooper painted a miniature of his bride Anne just before their wedding. In 1651 Peter Lely painted her portrait "in great" for ten shillings.

Family
 Thomas Wroth (1651-1671)
 Sir John Wroth, 2nd Baronet (1653–1677)
 Henry Wroth
 Sophia Wroth

References

17th-century English people
1627 births
1664 deaths
Baronets in the Baronetage of England
People from Bexley